The Medal "50 Years of the Mongolian People's Revolution" was a state award of the Mongolian People's Republic.

See also 
 Hero of the Mongolian People's Republic
 Order of Sukhbaatar

Orders, decorations, and medals of Mongolia
Golden jubilees